Jean Marie Vianney Hakizimana (born 31 January 1985, in Bujumbura) is a Burundian striker who plays with AS Inter Star.

Career
He has formerly played in Rwanda for Mukura Victory Sports FC and in his homeland for Prince Louis FC.

International career
Hakizimana was member of the Burundi national football team.

External links
 
 

1985 births
Living people
Burundian footballers
Burundi international footballers
Association football forwards
Sportspeople from Bujumbura
Burundian expatriate sportspeople in Rwanda
Burundian expatriate footballers
Expatriate footballers in Rwanda
Muzinga FC players
Prince Louis FC players